Tsepang Gladys Sello (born February 23, 1997) is a Mosotho middle-distance runner. She competed at the 2016 Summer Olympics in the women's 800 metres race; her time of 2:10.22 in the heats did not qualify her for the semifinals.

References

1997 births
Living people
Lesotho female middle-distance runners
Olympic athletes of Lesotho
Athletes (track and field) at the 2014 Summer Youth Olympics
Athletes (track and field) at the 2016 Summer Olympics
Athletes (track and field) at the 2018 Commonwealth Games
Commonwealth Games competitors for Lesotho
Athletes (track and field) at the 2019 African Games
African Games competitors for Lesotho